Elections for London Borough of Hackney Council were held on Thursday 6 May 2010. The whole council was up for election. Hackney is divided into 19 wards, each electing 3 councillors, so a total of 57 seats were up for election.

Summary results
At the 2010 council election, Labour won five seats from the Conservatives. These included two in New River; two in Lordship and one in Springfield. A former Green Party seat (in Clissold) was also lost to Labour. The Conservatives remain the largest opposition party with four seats (down from nine in 2006).

The election attracted national attention when, along with some other constituencies in the country, up to 270 people failed to be issued with ballot papers by the deadline of 10pm. This meant that they could not vote, and residents were angry when turned away from polling stations. The Council apologised unreservedly, blaming the high turnout for the problem.

Election for Mayor
The incumbent, Jules Pipe was elected for his third term as elected mayor of the London Borough of Hackney, at the first ballot, with a majority of 32,545.
Results for each candidate

 Votes cast: 93,770
 Overall Turnout for the Election of Mayor: 58% (34.3% in 2006, 26.34% in 2002)
 Result: Labour Hold

Under the Supplementary Vote system, if no candidate receives 50% of 1st choice votes, 2nd choice votes are added to the result for the top two 1st choice candidates. If a ballot gives a first and second preference to the top two candidates in either order, then their second preference is not counted, so that a second preference cannot count against a first.

Wards
Ward results summary:
Brownswood - Brian Bell, Oli de Botton, Feryal Demerci (all Labour)
Cazenove - Dawood Akhoon, Abraham Jacobson. Ian Sharer (all Liberal Democrats)
Chatham - Luke Akehurst, Sally Mulready, Guy Nicholson (all Labour)
Clissold -Karen Alcock, Wendy Mitchell, Linda Smith (all Labour)
Dalston - Michelle Gregory, Sophie Linden, Angus Mulready-Jones (all Labour)
De Beauvoir -Robert Chapman, Tom Ebbutt, Gulay Icoz (all Labour)
Hackney Central - Alan Laing, Samantha Lloyd, Vincent Stops (all Labour)
Hackney Downs - Michael Desmond, Rick Muir, Alex Russell (all Labour)
Haggerston - Barry Buitekant, Jonathon McShane, Ann Munn (all Labour)
Hoxton - Philip Glanville, Clay McKenzie, Carole Williams (all Labour)
King's Park - Julius Nikafu, Sharon Patrick, Saleem Siddiqui (all Labour)
Leabridge - Linda Kelly, Deniz Oguzkanli, Ian Rathbone (all Labour)
Lordship - Bernard Aussenberg (Conservative), Edward Brown (Labour), Daniel Stevens (Labour)
New River - Michael Jones (Labour), Maureen Middleton (Conservative), Sean Mulready (Labour)
Queensbridge - Emma Plouviez, Tom Price, Patrick Vernon (all Labour)
Springfield - Margaret Gordon (Labour), Michael Levy (Conservative), Simche Steinberger (Conservative)
Stoke Newington Central - Susan Fajan-Thomas, Rita Krishna, Louisa Thomson (all Labour)
Victoria - Kate Hanson, Daniel Kemp, Geoff Taylor (all Labour)
Wick - Anntoinette Bramble, Chris Kennedy, Jessica Webb (all Labour)

Detailed results

See also
2010 United Kingdom local elections

References

External links
Hackney council 2010 results

Council elections in the London Borough of Hackney
2010 London Borough council elections
May 2010 events in the United Kingdom